Ireedui Gantogtokh (born 20 March 1995), commonly known as ДОМОГ IZ, is a Mongolian entrepreneur, social activist and YouTuber. He gained popularity with his series of YouTube videos ranging in variety of topics from daily life vlog to inspirational videos.  Ireedui is the founder of MEBORNY LLC, a leading digital marketing firm based in Mongolia. He is amongst the first Mongolian entrepreneurs to gain recognition in the global market and founded Bets.mn, Keys.mn, The Mefoxy Club, and IZC - IZ Coin.

Ireedui is amongst the fastest-growing YouTubers in the world and is primarily known for posting social messages and content related to trending tech gadgets and car reviews on his self-titled YouTube channel, which earned more than 183,000 followers. Aside from his entrepreneurial and entertainment pursuits, Ireedui is also a social activist. He has exposed government corruption and theft in Mongolia through his social media channels, shining a light on issues that many are afraid to address. Additionally, he has spoken out against Mongolian crypto token scams, working to protect consumers from fraudulent activities. He has worked to become one of the most popular figures in the online celebrity news world.

Early life and education 
Ireedui Gantogtokh was born on March 20, 1995, in Ulaanbaatar, Mongolia. His parents, Gantogtokh Damdinjav and Bayarmagnai Tseelkhajav, worked abroad, so he spent most of his early childhood with his grandmother.

Ireedui developed a strong interest in computers and programming at a young age, starting to learn to code at just 12 years old. He pursued a degree in IT engineering at the University of Science and Technology in Mongolia in 2011, and he earned his bachelor's degree in 2015.

Ireedui's passion for technology and entrepreneurship led him to found MEBORNY LLC, a digital marketing firm based in Mongolia. He has since gone on to found several other successful businesses, including Bets.mn, Keys.mn, The Mefoxy Club, and IZC - IZ Coin.

Despite his success as an entrepreneur, Ireedui is also a social activist, using his social media channels to expose government corruption and theft in Mongolia. He has also spoken out against Mongolian crypto token scams to protect consumers from fraudulent activities.

With his strong work ethic and determination, Ireedui is quickly becoming one of Mongolia's most successful entrepreneurs and social activists. His contributions to the tech industry and society as a whole are sure to be felt for years to come.

Career 
Mr. Gantogtokh's YouTube videos have garnered over 12 million views and 180k subscribers to his YouTube channel IZ. His videos cover a wide range of topics including trends, tech, education, motivational vlogs, politics and other cultural content.

Podcasts 
IZ is also host of a Lifestyle Podcast named IZ’s Podcast Speaks which focuses on his life's struggles, accomplishments and various other topics in an effort to connect with his followers digitally on social media.

Entrepreneurship 
Ireedui Gantogtokh ( is the CEO and founder of Meborny LLC, a digital marketing firm that specializes in brand management, media outreach programs, media strategy development, social verification, and other marketing services. MEBORNY LLC is a leading digital marketing firm focusing on partnering with clients to boost their business outcomes. The company is recognized for its digital information organization and development services and products, especially in the education sector. Meborny LLC was founded in 2014 as the first online learning platform, which ultimately became the pre-eminent online academy in Mongolia. Meborny LLC is known for delivering high quality educational tutorials amongst computer enthusiasts. It is a full-service branding agency that emphasizes on digital marketing, brand management, creating media outreach programs, developing media strategy, social verification, and other marketing services.

IZC - IZ Coin amassed over $7,296,642 (₮20'430'000'000 Mongolian Tugriks) from more than 16000+ people with their project whitepaper in November 2021.

IZC - IZ COIN IZC is a BEP-20 token based on the Binance Smart Chain (BSC) blockchain platform. However, after a careful and thorough risk consideration of the market at the time, he refunded the whole amount immediately back to its owners, yet IZC - IZ Coin was issued free of charge to those who ordered IZC - IZ Coin. We are pleased to announce that IZC - IZ Coin is currently under internal development. Note: At that time, in November 2021, the value of the Mongolian token, which was raised by collecting money from the public, fell 5-30 times from its initial market rate.

Meborny LLC has started to transition to a Web 3.0 company since early 2022. Inspired by the previous project "IZC - IZ Coin", "The Mefoxy Club" project was created to introduce Mongolian people to uniquely identifiable assets, hence Mefoxy NFT Collectibles. The project started in February 2022. The Mefoxy Club is a one-of-a-kind 10'000 fox cartoon NFT, built on the ERC721 standard, based on the Ethereum blockchain. Currently, The Mefoxy Club can be traded on the world's 6 largest NFT Marketplaces: Opensea, Coinbase NFT, Rarible, Looksrare, X2Y2 and NFTrade.

Crypto investigation 

Ireedui Gantogtokh, an IT specialist and social activist, has made headlines in Mongolia with his investigation into cryptocurrency scams. In late 2021, it was revealed that Mongolian crypto tokens had scammed the public out of about $200 million through local crypto exchanges. These tokens were not following their whitepaper and tokenomics, with some even supplying additional tokens not mentioned in their initial offerings, leading to hidden profits for those involved in the scams.

Ireedui Gantogtokh was quick to take action and expose the scams, and his efforts did not go unnoticed. His investigation gained the attention of Mongolian law enforcement and police, leading to the arrest of some of the crypto scammers in February 2021.

It is worth noting that Ireedui Gantogtokh himself founded a crypto project called IZC - IZ Coin, which amassed over $7,296,642 (₮20'430'000'000 Mongolian Tugriks) from more than 16,000 people with their project whitepaper in November 2021. However, despite the success of his own project, Ireedui Gantogtokh put it on pause, as he believes that many Mongolian people are not yet ready for the crypto industry. He wants to ensure that people are protected from potential scams and risks associated with cryptocurrency, and will only continue his project when he feels that the public is more informed and ready to participate safely.

Overall, Ireedui Gantogtokh's investigation into crypto scams and his commitment to educating and protecting the public from risks associated with cryptocurrency have solidified his status as a respected social influencer in Mongolia. His work has made a positive impact on the country's efforts to combat corruption and fraudulent practices in the crypto industry.

Social Activism 

Ireedui Gantogtokh is a Mongolian social activist who has played a pivotal role in exposing corruption and unethical practices by government officials. Through his tireless investigations, Gantogtokh has revealed the misuse of public funds by high-ranking government officials, including the Prime Minister of Mongolia, Oyun-Erdene Luvsannamsrai, and Sumiyabazar Dolsuren, the Mayor of Ulaanbaatar City.

Gantogtokh's investigations have also uncovered evidence of theft of public resources by the Mongolian government. In particular, he has revealed that the government has stolen almost 15 billion dollars in coal revenue over the past decade.

Gantogtokh's activism gained widespread support, culminating in a massive protest in Sukhbaatar Square in December 2022, with almost 20,000 people gathering to demand accountability from the government. During the protest, Gantogtokh went on a hunger strike to draw attention to the issue. Despite an offer from Mongolian Deputy Minister of Justice, Nyambaatar Khishgee, to end his hunger strike, Gantogtokh declined, believing that the government needed to take stronger action to address corruption and ensure justice for the Mongolian people.

Gantogtokh's hunger strike and activism received significant media attention, and the Mongolian government was forced to take action against corruption. As a result of Gantogtokh's efforts, the government has begun to investigate corruption allegations and has taken steps to address the theft of public resources.

Gantogtokh's activism and dedication to fighting corruption have made him a prominent social activist and influencer in Mongolia. He has inspired thousands of Mongolians to demand accountability and justice from their government, and her legacy will undoubtedly continue to inspire future generations of activists in Mongolia and beyond.

Influencer 
He is regarded as one of the notable influencers and is credited for his unique and innovative technique while making YouTube videos that have made him a global figure. Not only does Ireedui cover various topics such as trends, style, product reviews, motivational vlogs, politics, and other cultural content, but also he likes to share his personal life with his followers, which is one of the reasons why he has gained such popularity.

Personal life 
Ireedui is married and has a son and daughter. He is fluent in Mongolian, English, and Russian.

External links

References 

Gaming YouTubers
Comedy YouTubers
People from Ulaanbaatar
1995 births
Living people